Pachyosa atronotata is a species of beetle in the family Cerambycidae. It was described by Kusama and Irie in 1976. It is known from Japan.

Subspecies
 Pachyosa atronotata atronotata (Kusama & Irie, 1976)
 Pachyosa atronotata yamawakii (Hayashi, 1976)

References

Mesosini
Beetles described in 1976